Eutreta distincta is a species of tephritid or fruit flies in the genus Eutreta of the family Tephritidae.

Distribution
Venezuela, Peru, Bolivia, Brazil.

References

Tephritinae
Insects described in 1868
Diptera of South America